Pope County is the name of three counties in the United States:

 Pope County, Arkansas
 Pope County, Illinois 
 Pope County, Minnesota